Sung Hyuk (born Hong Sung-hyuk on March 2, 1984) is a South Korean actor. He made his acting debut in 2005, and has starred in the television dramas Jang Bo-ri is Here! and You Are the Only One.

Personal life 
On September 26, 2022, Sung's agency announced that he is getting married to his non-celebrity girlfriend in October 21 in Seoul.

Filmography

Television series

Film

Music video

Variety show

Awards and nominations

References

External links 
  
  
 Sung Hyuk at FNC Entertainment 
 
 
 

1984 births
Living people
South Korean male television actors
South Korean male film actors
FNC Entertainment artists